is a subway station on the Tokyo Metro Fukutoshin Line in Toshima, Tokyo, Japan, operated by the Tokyo subway operator Tokyo Metro. It is numbered "F-10".

Lines

The station is adjacent to Kishibojimmae Station on the Toden Arakawa Line. To prevent confusion, the former Zōshigaya Station on the Arakawa Line was renamed  when the Fukutoshin Line opened in 2008.

Station layout
The station consists of one underground island platform located on the fourth basement ("4BF") level, serving two tracks.

Platforms

History
The station opened on 14 June 2008 with the opening of the Fukutoshin Line from Ikebukuro to Shibuya.

Passenger statistics
In fiscal 2015, the station was used by an average of 17,437 passengers daily, making it the least used station on the Fukutoshin Line and the 126th-busiest on the Tokyo Metro network. The passenger statistics for previous years are as shown below.

Surrounding area

 Kishibojimmae Station on the Toden Arakawa Line

See also
 List of railway stations in Japan

References

External links

Tokyo Metro station information (Tokyo Metro)

Railway stations in Tokyo
Tokyo Metro Fukutoshin Line
Stations of Tokyo Metro
Railway stations in Japan opened in 2008